Gisela Marziotta (born 19 March, 1975) is an Argentine journalist, writer and politician, who is currently a member of the Argentine Chamber of Deputies representing the Autonomous City of Buenos Aires since 2020 for the Frente de Todos coalition.

Early life and education
Marziotta was born on 19 March 1975 in Bahía Blanca. Her family moved to Buenos Aires when she was 2 years old. She studied journalism at Taller Escuela Agencia and political science at the University of Buenos Aires. In the 90s she began her political involvement in the Radical Civic Union.

Political career
Marziotta was the 5th candidate in the Buenos Aires City Unidad Porteña list to the Argentine Chamber of Deputies in the 2017 legislative election. The list received 21.74% of the popular vote, and Marziotta was not elected; however, on 23 December 2019, Daniel Filmus (the first candidate in the list) stepped down from his seat in order to be appointed as Secretary of Malvinas Affairs in the Alberto Fernández administration, and Marziotta was sworn in accordingly in Filmus's place. She took office on 29 January 2020.

In the 2019 Buenos Aires city election, Marziotta was the Deputy Chief of Government candidate in the Frente de Todos ticket, under Matías Lammens. The ticket received 35.07% of the popular vote, trailing behind the winning Juntos por el Cambio ticket of Horacio Rodríguez Larreta and Diego Santilli.

Electoral history

Executive

Legislative

Publications
Marziotta has authored or co-authored some of the following books and publications:

 (co-authored with Mariano Hamilton)

 (co-authored with María Seoane)

References

External links

 (in Spanish)
Profile on the official website of the Chamber of Deputies (in Spanish)

1975 births
People from Bahía Blanca
Politicians from Buenos Aires
Journalists from Buenos Aires
21st-century Argentine politicians
Argentine journalists
Argentine women journalists
21st-century Argentine women politicians
University of Buenos Aires alumni
Members of the Argentine Chamber of Deputies elected in Buenos Aires
Women members of the Argentine Chamber of Deputies
Living people